Joe Hastings (born May 5, 1987) is a former American football wide receiver. He was signed by the San Francisco 49ers as an undrafted free agent in 2011. He played college football at Washburn.

Playing career

San Francisco 49ers (2011−2012)
Hastings was signed by the San Francisco 49ers as an undrafted free agent following the 2011 NFL Draft on July 27, 2011. He was released following training camp and was signed to the 49ers practice squad on September 4. He was promoted to the active roster for several games late in the season.

In 2012, he was cut by the 49ers after an injury limited his role in training camp.

Sacramento Mountain Lions (2012)
Hastings signed with the UFL's Sacramento Mountain Lions.

San Francisco 49ers (2013)
In 2013, he once again signed with the 49ers. He was released on June 4, 2013, in order to make room on the roster for Kassim Osgood, he was then picked up by the Miami Dolphins.

Miami Dolphins (2013)
On June 13, 2013, Hastings was signed by the Miami Dolphins. On July 8, 2013, the Dolphins placed Hastings on the reserve/retired list.  He retired from professional football the next day.

Executive career
Hastings was hired by the Philadelphia Eagles as a pro personnel assistant on June 4, 2014.

Coaching career
Hastings was hired by the University of Michigan as a defensive graduate assistant in January 2015.
Hastings became the wide receivers coach at Indiana State University in February 2018.

In February 2021, Hastings was announced by the Indianapolis Colts as an assistant special teams coach.

References

External links
San Francisco 49ers bio
Washburn Ichabod Herd bio

1987 births
Living people
Players of American football from Wichita, Kansas
American football wide receivers
Washburn Ichabods football players
San Francisco 49ers players
Miami Dolphins players
Philadelphia Eagles executives
Michigan Wolverines football coaches
Indianapolis Colts coaches